Neil Busse (born 3 April 1945) is  a former Australian rules footballer who played with Richmond and South Melbourne in the Victorian Football League (VFL). 

He was a member of the AFL Tribunal for eighteen years, the last ten as chairperson, until his retirement in November 1997.

Notes

External links 

Living people
1945 births
Australian rules footballers from Victoria (Australia)
Richmond Football Club players
Sydney Swans players
Benalla Football Club players
Sandringham Football Club players